Will Richardson Jr. (born January 4, 1996) is an American football offensive tackle who is a free agent. He played college football at NC State.

Professional career
Richardson was drafted by the Jacksonville Jaguars in the fourth round (129th overall) of the 2018 NFL Draft. After missing the first six games with a knee injury, the Jaguars decided to place Richardson on injured reserve on October 20, 2018.

Richardson became a starter for the Jaguars in 2021 after Ben Bartch entered COVID-19 protocols. On December 26, 2021, Richardson scored a touchdown in a 26-21 loss to the New York Jets after he recovered a Trevor Lawrence fumble in the endzone.

On March 16, 2022, Richardson re-signed with the Jaguars. He was released on August 31, 2022.

References

External links
Jacksonville Jaguars bio

1996 births
Living people
People from Burlington, North Carolina
Players of American football from North Carolina
American football offensive tackles
NC State Wolfpack football players
Jacksonville Jaguars players